Gaobeidian East railway station is a railway station on the Beijing–Shijiazhuang high-speed railway located in Gaobeidian, Hebei. It opened with the railway on 26 December 2012.

References

Railway stations in Hebei
Railway stations in China opened in 2012